A. J. Ouellette (born July 20, 1995) is an American professional gridiron football running back for the Toronto Argonauts of the Canadian Football League (CFL).

College career
Ouellette played college football for the Ohio Bobcats from 2014 to 2018 while using a medical redshirt season in 2017 after suffering an injury in his first game that year. He finished his collegiate career having played in 50 games where he had 719 carries for 3,833 yards and 32 rushing touchdowns and 64 receptions for 516 yards and six receiving touchdowns.

Awards and recognition
Two time Team captain.
Rushed for 1,000 yards in 2017 and 2018.
Second Team All-MAC Offense 2017.
Honored by the touchdown Club of Columbus, 2015. 
In 2015 lead team in rush attempts and rushing yards.
in 2014 was two-time MAC East Offensive Player of the Week (Nov. 6 and 24).
DXL Frisco Bowl Offensive MVP.

College statistics

Professional career

New Orleans Saints
In May 2019, Ouellette signed with the New Orleans Saints. New Orleans waived Ouellette on May 28, 2019.

Cleveland Browns
On July 27, 2019, Ouellette signed with the Cleveland Browns. However, he was waived by Cleveland on August 31, 2019.

Toronto Argonauts
On September 17, 2019, it was announced that Ouellette had signed with the Toronto Argonauts. He played in his first career game on October 18, 2019, against the Montreal Alouettes where he had four carries for 20 yards. In the following game, he recorded his first career touchdown on a 15-yard pass from Dakota Prukop in a game against the Ottawa Redblacks on October 26, 2019. He played in three regular season games in 2019 where he had 23 carries for 114 yards and five receptions for 39 yards and one touchdown.

Ouellette did not play in 2020 due to the cancellation of the 2020 CFL season, but signed a contract extension with the Argonauts on December 15, 2020. In 2021, he played in just six games while spending time on the injured list and practice roster, but recorded 23 carries for 143 yards. Ouellette made his post-season debut, on December 5, 2021, after playing in the East Final where he had four carries for eight yards in the loss to the Hamilton Tiger-Cats.

Ouellette began the 2022 season on the injured list and played in just three of the team's first eight games as the back up running back. However, following a season-ending injury to the team's starting running back, Andrew Harris, Ouellette became the team's starting running back on August 20, 2022, where he had six carries for 18 yards and seven catches for 92 yards against the Calgary Stampeders. He scored his first career rushing touchdown on September 10, 2022, in the victory over the Ottawa Redblacks. Ouellette finished the season having played in 13 regular season games carrying the ball 98 times for 516 yards with two touchdowns. He also caught 38 passes for 350 yards and a score. On February 11, 2023, Ouellette and the Argos agree to a contract extension.

Personal life
Ouellette was born to parents Phil and Jody Ouellette and has one older sister, Ashlie. Ouellette is married to Haley Ouellette.

References

External links
 Toronto Argonauts bio
 Ohio Bobcats football bio

1995 births
Living people
American players of Canadian football
American football running backs
Canadian football running backs
Players of American football from Ohio
Players of Canadian football from Ohio
Ohio Bobcats football players
Toronto Argonauts players